Milford is a borough in Pike County, Pennsylvania, United States, and the county seat. Its population was 1,103 at the 2020 census. Located on the upper Delaware River, Milford is part of the New York metropolitan area.

History
The area along the Delaware River had long been settled by the Lenape, an Algonquian-speaking indigenous tribe that lived in the mid-Atlantic coastal areas at the time of European colonization. The English also called them the Delaware, after the river they named for colonial leader Thomas West, 3rd Baron De La Warr, the Delaware.

Milford was founded in 1796 by Judge John Biddis, one of Pennsylvania's first four circuit judges. He named the settlement after his ancestral home in Wales.

Milford has a large number of buildings of historical significance, many constructed in the nineteenth century and early twentieth centuries. Some are listed on the National Register of Historic Places, while numerous others are included in the Milford Historic District.  Of the 655 buildings in the district, 400 of them have been deemed to be historically significant. The district is characterized by a variety of Late Victorian architecture.

Grey Towers National Historic Site, the ancestral home of Gifford Pinchot, noted conservationist, two-time Governor of Pennsylvania, and first head of the U.S. Forest Service, is located in Milford. It was designed by architect Richard Morris Hunt has been designated a National Historic Site.

From 1904 to 1926, Grey Towers was the site of summer field study sessions for the Master's program of the Yale School of Forestry, together with the Forester's Hall, a commercial building that was adapted and expanded for this purpose. Jervis Gordon Grist Mill Historic District, Hotel Fauchere and Annex, Metz Ice Plant, and Pike County Courthouse are also listed on the National Register of Historic Places. Nearby is Arisbe, the home of Charles S. Peirce, a prominent logician, philosopher and scientist in the late 19th century, and another NRHP property.

The Pike County Historical Society Museum in Milford includes in its collection the "Lincoln Flag", which was draped on President Abraham Lincoln's booth at Ford's Theatre the night he was assassinated. The flag was bundled up and placed under the President's head, and still bears his blood. It was kept by stage manager Thomas Gourlay. He passed it down to his daughter Jeannie, an actress who had appeared in the play, Our American Cousin, at the theatre that night. She later moved to Milford and the flag was donated to the museum after her death.

The Milford Writer's Workshop, an annual science-fiction writer's event, was founded in 1956, and ran until it moved to the United Kingdom in 1972, where it is still running.

In September 2007, Arthur Frommer's Budget Travel named Milford second on its list of "Ten Coolest Small Towns" in Pennsylvania.

Geography

Milford is located on the Upper Delaware River, which divides Pennsylvania's Poconos region from the Catskill Mountains in New York, in what was historically a heavily forested area. When Judge Biddis bought up the land of what was then known as Wells Ferry and laid out the lots for the new town, he generally followed the urban plan of Philadelphia: he laid out High Street – the equivalent of what is now Market Street in Philadelphia – running to the Delaware River, while Broad Street runs perpendicular to High, creating a grid.  At the intersection of Broad and High is a public square – just as there is at Broad and Market in Philadelphia – and most of Milford's official buildings are located there. Within the grid, east–west streets are numbered, Second through Seventh, with Broad Street falling between Fourth and Fifth Streets, while north–south streets are named after Judge Biddis' children: Ann, Catherine, George, John, Sarah and Elizabeth.  In between both the named and numbered streets are alleys, named after berries and fruit.

In contemporary Milford, Broad Street is also marked as U.S. Route 6 and U.S. Route 209. At its intersection with Harford Street, Route 6 continues north on Harford, while Route 209 continues south on the street.

Milford is located on an escarpment above the Delaware River. All waterways there which drain into the river fall the  difference in height, creating what is known as a fluviarchy, a network of waterfalls, putatively the most notable one east of the Rocky Mountains. These also provided water power to mills, which contributed to Milford's economy in the 19th century.

Demographics
As of the census of 2010, there were 1,021 people, 491 households, and 236 families residing in the borough. The population density was 2,042 people per square mile (797.7/km2). There were 580 housing units at an average density of 1,160 per square mile (453.1/km2). The racial makeup of the borough was 95.2% White, 0.6% African American, 0.5% Native American, 0.5% Asian, 1.4% from other races, and 1.9% from two or more races. Hispanic or Latino of any race were 5.5% of the population.  Pike County has one of the highest concentration of same-sex households of any county in Pennsylvania.

There were 491 households, out of which 19.6% had children under the age of 18 living with them, 35.4% were married couples living together, 10.2% had a female householder with no husband present, and 51.9% were non-families. 42.4% of all households were made up of individuals, and 21.4% had someone living alone who was 65 years of age or older. The average household size was 2.01 and the average family size was 2.79.

In the borough the population was spread out, with 16.3% under the age of 18, 59.9% from 18 to 64, and 23.8% who were 65 years of age or older. The median age was 48.3 years.

The median income for a household in the borough was $33,571, and the median income for a family was $46,136. Males had a median income of $40,500 versus $28,333 for females. The per capita income for the borough was $21,011. About 4.0% of families and 9.1% of the population were below the poverty line, including 8.1% of those under age 18 and 5.6% of those age 65 or over.

Education
Milford is served by the Delaware Valley School District. Including an Elementary school in Matamoras, serving children from Matamoras, and Milford. Delaware Valley middle school serves children from Milford, Matamoras and Shohola areas. Delaware Valley High School serves children from Milford, Matamoras, Shohola, and Dingman areas.

Cultural activities
Milford is home to Pike County Arts and Crafts, an art education organization that was chosen by the Pennsylvania Council on the Arts as winner of the 2007 Pennsylvania State "Creative Community Award.". Since 1950, Pike County Arts and Crafts has also hosted an annual art show each July in Borough Hall.

The Pike County Chess Club was founded in 2011. Games played at these tournaments are submitted for rating by the United States Chess Federation (USCF), with which the club is affiliated.

Annual festivals include the Black Bear Film Festival, Milford Readers & Writers Festival, Milford Music Festival, Festival of Wood and DanceFest Milford.  Throughout the year there are "Artwalks" and other events celebrating artists in the area.

Annual events
The Black Bear Film Festival is an annual independent film festival, which has taken place the weekend after Columbus Day in October every years since 2000. Held primarily at the historic Milford Theater, the festival also includes many free films and lectures in a Film Salon, as well as feature films for an admission fee.  In recent years, stars participating in the film festival have included Farley Granger, Tab Hunter, Marge Champion, Lorna Luft, Arlene Dahl, Larry Kramer and others.

The Milford Music Festival takes place each June. It is a free weekend event sponsored by Milfordmusicfest.org, which also produces Septemberfest, Share The Harvest and the annual Tree Lighting.  The 2009 Milford Music Festival was headlined by Vanessa Carlton, the Grammy-nominated singer-songwriter/pianist who is from Milford. In 2013, the festival featured Pete Seeger.

The Milford Readers and Writers Festival, inaugurated in 2015, is held in September each year and focuses on facilitating conversation between readers and writers.  Recent featured guests have included Lee Child, John Berendt, Robin Morgan, Gloria Steinem, Tim Murphy, Tim Teeman, M.K. Asante, Alan Alda, Billy Goldstein, Brooke Warner, Suzanne Braun Levine, Anne-Christine d'Adesky, Sean Strub, Mary Badham, Robert Moor, Susan Faludi, Julie Barton, Carol Jenkins, Lucian Truscott IV, Frances FitzGerald, Judge Andrew Napolitano, Phil Klay, John Leland, Ducan Hannah, Bob Eckstein, and others.

Notable people
 Louis Allen, a New York Army National Guard officer killed in a fragging incident in 2005 during the Iraq War
 James Blish, Damon Knight, Judith Merril and Kate Wilhelm (Mrs. Knight), all science fiction writers
 Vanessa Carlton, singer/pianist
 Bob Guccione, Jr, magazine publisher
 Allyn Joslyn, stage and screen actor
 Christopher Makos, photographer
 Martin & Muñoz, visual artists also known as Walter Martin & Paloma Muñoz
 Frank McCourt, author
 Mary Pickford, silent film actress
 Gifford Pinchot's family, including Cornelia Bryce Pinchot and Mary Pinchot Meyer
 Al Pitrelli, guitarist
 Tom Quick, first born child of European ancestry in the region, purported to have murdered numerous Lenape, an indigenous people of the area
 Charles Sanders Peirce, a philosopher and polymath, lived on a farm 3 miles from Milford, from 1887 until his 1914 death
 Bill Steele, Major League Baseball pitcher for the St. Louis Cardinals, born and raised in Milford
 Sean Strub, writer, activist, founder of POZ magazine*, and current mayor of Milford 
 Christopher Makos, artist, photographer
 Mary Wiseman, actress, (Star Trek Discovery)

Gallery

See also
National Register of Historic Places listings in Pike County, Pennsylvania

References

External links

1874 establishments in Pennsylvania
Boroughs in Pike County, Pennsylvania
Boroughs in Pennsylvania
County seats in Pennsylvania
Historic districts on the National Register of Historic Places in Pennsylvania
National Register of Historic Places in Pike County, Pennsylvania
Pennsylvania populated places on the Delaware River
Pocono Mountains
Populated places established in 1796
Towns in the New York metropolitan area